Agnidra argypha is a moth in the family Drepanidae. It was described by Hong-Fu Chu and Lin-Yao Wang in 1988. It is found in Yunnan, China.

The length of the forewings is 9–10 mm. Both wings have a silvery colour, with two oblique black lines on the forewings, as well as four or five whitish spots in the cell.

References

Moths described in 1988
Drepaninae
Moths of Asia